Károly Koller, originally Karl (28 January 1838, Hermannstadt - 26 November 1889, Budapest) was an Austro-Hungarian photographer and painter.

Biography 
His father was originally from Tyrolia, and his mother was from an upper-class family in Kronstadt. He attended the German grammar school in his hometown and studied with the drawing teacher, with whom he was associated for many years; operating a joint studio. From 1859 to 1871, he worked as a drawing teacher in Bistritz, where he first developed his interest in photography. He pulblished two albums in 1862, togteher with Glatz, depicting notable Transylvanian personalities and Trachten (clothing). From 1866, he was a member of the Viennese .

After Glatz died, in 1871, he closed the drawing school, but continued to operate the photography studio, opening branches in Klausenburg and Neumarkt. In 1873, he transferred the company to Glatz's niece, Camilla Asbóth (1838–1908), thereby making her the first independent female photographer in Transylvania. At the 1873 Vienna World's Fair, he received awards for his portraits and chromophotography techniques.

In 1874, he took photographs at the Royal Hungarian residence, Schloss Gödöllő, and was named Court Photographer. The following year, he opened a studio under his Hungarian name, in Budapest, where he employed over thirty people. The well-known artist, József Borsos, also worked there for a time.

He was able to attract a clientele that included many of the local Austro-Hungarian nobility, as well as members of the Imperial Family. A planned move to Klagenfurt was never accomplished. After his sudden death, while dining at a café, his longtime employees, Román Forché and István Gálfy, took over the firm; running it until 1908.

Selected photographs from the Koller studios

References

External links 

1838 births
1889 deaths
Hungarian artists
Hungarian photographers
Austro-Hungarian artists
Academy of Fine Arts Vienna alumni
Transylvanian Saxon people
People from Sibiu